Debra Hill (November 10, 1950 – March 7, 2005) was an American film producer and screenwriter, best known for producing various works of John Carpenter.

She also co-wrote four of his films: Halloween, The Fog, Escape from New York and Escape from L.A. They also wrote and produced Halloween II together.

Early life
Hill was born in Haddonfield, New Jersey, and grew up in Philadelphia, Pennsylvania. In 1975, she started as a production assistant on adventure documentaries and progressed through jobs as a script supervisor, assistant director and second unit director. Hill first worked with John Carpenter in 1975, as the script supervisor and assistant editor of Assault on Precinct 13. This led not only to further professional collaborations between Hill and Carpenter, but also marked the beginning of their personal relationship.

Career
In 1978, she and director Carpenter co-wrote the horror movie Halloween. Following its success, Hill and Carpenter worked together on Halloween II (1981) and Halloween III: Season of the Witch (1982). Their other credits together include: The Fog (1980), Escape from New York (1981) and its sequel, Escape from L.A. (1996). In 1986, Hill formed an independent production company with her friend Lynda Obst. Together, they produced Adventures in Babysitting, Heartbreak Hotel, and The Fisher King. In 1988, she entered a contract with Walt Disney Pictures under which she produced Gross Anatomy, short films for the Walt Disney theme park, and an NBC special for Disneyland's 35th anniversary. She also produced The Dead Zone (1983), Head Office (1985), and Clue (1985).

She was honored by Women in Film in 2003 with the Crystal Award. She recalled the transition from being called "sweetheart" and "darling" in her early years as a producer to the respectful "ma'am" many years later on the DVD commentary for Escape From New York with production designer Joe Alves.

Hill helped support talent in the film industry, and a number of Hill's associates went on to later success in film. For example, James Cameron, the filmmaker, once worked for Hill in the visual effects department. Jeffrey Chernov was Hill's second assistant director and went on to become an executive producer of Black Panther.

Friends and colleagues commented that Hill became frustrated with the film industry in that the industry did not welcome more women as directors. Even with the lack of support, Hill persisted with her work.

Health and death
Hill was diagnosed with colon cancer in February 2004. Despite her diagnosis and eventual amputation of her legs, Hill continued to work on several projects. She worked with John Carpenter and actor Kurt Russell on a comic adaptation of the Snake Plissken character, as well as a proposed Snake Plissken video game.

In 2005, Hill reunited with Carpenter to produce the remake of The Fog and was working on the Oliver Stone film World Trade Center when she died of cancer on March 7, 2005. After her death, Carpenter told the Associated Press that working with Hill was "one of the greatest experiences of my life – she had a passion for not just movies about women or women's ideas but films for everybody".

Filmography

Films

Television

References

External links

 
 Halloween writer Debra Hill dies obituary at the BBC
 Debra Hill, 54, Film Producer Who Helped Create 'Halloween', Dies obituary at the NYT.

1950 births
2005 deaths
Film producers from Pennsylvania
Screenwriters from Pennsylvania
People from Haddonfield, New Jersey
Writers from Philadelphia
American women screenwriters
Deaths from cancer in California
Screenwriters from New Jersey
American women film producers
Film producers from New Jersey
20th-century American women writers
20th-century American screenwriters
21st-century American women